Kathryn Prescott (born 4 June 1991) is an English actress, best known for her roles as Emily Fitch on the E4 teen drama series Skins (2009–2010) and the titular character in the MTV teen drama Finding Carter (2014–2015).

Career
In July 2008, Prescott and twin sister Megan appeared in an episode of soap opera Doctors, playing twin sisters Amy and Charlotte Wilcox in "Dare, Double Dare, Truth". Beginning in early 2009, Prescott played Emily Fitch in series 3, 4 and 7 of Skins, with characters known as the "second generation". Prescott stated on her official website in March 2010 that she had a role in the pilot of Goth. Prescott starred as Carter Stevens/Lyndon Wilson on MTV'S Finding Carter. She then, in 2019 appeared in the movie A Dog's Journey as CJ.

Personal life
Kathryn was born in Palmers Green, London, England. She is six minutes older than her twin sister, Megan. In providing her "Top Ten Playlist" on the Skins official website, Prescott named Röyksopp, The Cardigans and Metallica as her favourite music. In response to a fan's question on her official website, Prescott revealed that she would prefer to not label herself regarding her sexuality, and "does not think people are defined by their sexuality", suggesting that "it doesn't change who you are as a person". Following another question, she revealed that while she is not "strictly" a vegetarian, she is wary of what meat she consumes.

On 7 September 2021, Prescott was struck by a truck while crossing the street in Brooklyn, and suffered serious injuries, including a fractured pelvis, legs, a foot, and a hand. On 1 October 2021, her sister Megan, revealed Kathryn had been released from hospital and was recovering at home. Prescott's sister was initially denied emergency entry to the United States, due to travel restrictions put in place to combat the spread of COVID-19, despite providing evidence of vaccination and a negative test as well as her sister's medical records, but the decision was ultimately reversed after Prescott went public about the ordeal.

Filmography

Film

Television

Music videos

Video games

References

External links
 
 
 

1991 births
Actresses from London
Alumni of the Mountview Academy of Theatre Arts
British identical twins
English film actresses
English television actresses
Identical twin actresses
Living people
People educated at Palmers Green High School
English twins